Erzsébeti Spartacus Munkás Testgyakorlók Köre Labdarúgó Egyesület, commonly known as ESMTK, is a Hungarian football club from the town of Pesterzsébet, Hungary.

History
Erzsébeti Spartacus Munkás Testgyakorlók Köre Labdarúgó Egyesület debuted in the 1945 season of the Hungarian League and finished seventh.

Name Changes 
1909–1924: Erzsébetfalvai Munkás Testedző Kör
1910: merger with Munkás Testedző Egyesület (MTE) and Erzsébetfalvai Remény SC
1913: merger with Erzsébetfalvai FC
1924: Erzsébetfalva became city as Pesterzsébet 
1924–1939: Erzsébeti Munkás Testedző Kör
1939: merger with Drasche Grubacs SC
1939–1944: Pesterzsébeti MTK
1944–1945: Pestszenterzsébeti Kossuth Munkás SE
1945: Pesterzsébeti MTK
1945–1949: Erzsébeti MTK
1949–1956: Pesterzsébeti Vasas SK
1952: merger with Ferencvárosi Vasas
1956–1958: Erzsébeti Munkás TK
1958–1970: Erzsébeti VTK
1970–1973: Erzsébeti Munkás TK
1973: merger with Erzsébeti Spartacus
1973–1991: Erzsébeti Spartacus Munkás TK
1991–1992: ESMTK-Bauinvest
1992–1995: ESMTK-Hungaplast
1995–?: Erzsébeti Spartacus Munkás TK
?-?: Erzsébeti Spartacus Munkás TK – Hungaro Casing
2007–present: Erzsébeti Spartacus Munkás Testgyakorlók Köre Labdarúgó Egyesület

References

External links
 Profile

Football clubs in Hungary
1909 establishments in Hungary